Godfrey-Lee Public Schools is a public school district located in the city of Wyoming, Michigan.  The district's main high school is Lee High School.

References

External links
 

School districts in Michigan
Education in Kent County, Michigan